Whakamaru  is a town in the central region of the North Island of New Zealand. The Maori words 'whaka' and 'maru' literally mean to give shelter to, or safeguard.

History 

The Whakamaru supervolcano eruption (dated to 320–340,000 years ago) is the largest known eruption from the area known as the Taupo Volcanic Zone (TVZ) and means the town is located in the historic Whakamaru caldera.

The name is a shortened version of Te Whakamarumarutanga o Kahukeke ("The Shelter of Kahukeke"). According to Waikato Tainui oral traditions, Kahukeke, the Māori healer and explorer, who had arrived in New Zealand on the Tainui migratory canoe fell ill at the spot and the area was named for the shelter where she recovered. In some versions the shelter was built by her husband Rakatāura / Hape, the tohunga of the Tainui. 

The town of Whakamaru was originally established as accommodation for the Whakamaru Power Station in New Zealand. The Whakamaru switching station, adjacent to the power station, is operated by Transpower, and is an important node on the national grid.

Demographics
The settlement is part of the larger Marotiri statistical area.

Whakamaru had a population of 168 at the 2018 New Zealand census, an increase of 6 people (3.7%) since the 2013 census, and unchanged since the 2006 census. There were 60 households, comprising 84 males and 84 females, giving a sex ratio of 1.0 males per female. The median age was 48.0 years (compared with 37.4 years nationally), with 39 people (23.2%) aged under 15 years, 18 (10.7%) aged 15 to 29, 84 (50.0%) aged 30 to 64, and 27 (16.1%) aged 65 or older.

Ethnicities were 82.1% European/Pākehā, 41.1% Māori, 1.8% Pacific peoples, and 5.4% Asian. People may identify with more than one ethnicity.

Although some people chose not to answer the census's question about religious affiliation, 62.5% had no religion, 26.8% were Christian, 3.6% had Māori religious beliefs, and 1.8% were Hindu.

Of those at least 15 years old, 9 (7.0%) people had a bachelor's or higher degree, and 42 (32.6%) people had no formal qualifications. The median income was $23,900, compared with $31,800 nationally. 18 people (14.0%) earned over $70,000 compared to 17.2% nationally. The employment status of those at least 15 was that 57 (44.2%) people were employed full-time, 24 (18.6%) were part-time, and 3 (2.3%) were unemployed.

Recreation and amenities 

During the summer months Lake Whakamaru is used extensively for water skiing. The Whakamaru Water Ski Club is very busy during the Christmas holidays, although water skiing courses are normally available all year round. Kiwiburn, the New Zealand Burning Man regional, was held annually at the Whakamaru Domain, State Highway 30, from 2007 to 2013.

The town has a resident association, grocery store, cafe, pizza restaurant, and petrol station. Guided walks are available for the nearby Mt Titiraupenga, located at the geographic centre of The North Island.

Education

References 

Populated places in Waikato
Taupō District
Populated places on the Waikato River